The Columbia Commercial Historic District in Columbia, Kentucky, was listed on the National Register of Historic Places in 2017.  It is a  historic district with 29 contributing buildings, two non-contributing buildings, and a non-contributing site.

It is "centered on its tallest building, the National Register-listed Adair County Courthouse (1885), forming a traditional public square made by the buildings that surround the courthouse."

References

Historic districts on the National Register of Historic Places in Kentucky
National Register of Historic Places in Adair County, Kentucky
Columbia, Kentucky